Torinal may refer to:
 Diphenhydramine, sold under the trade name Torinal, and the one most commonly referred to by that name
 Methaqualone, also called Torinal in some cases